Ƶ (minuscule: ƶ) is a letter of the Latin alphabet, derived from Z with the addition of a stroke through the centre.

Use in alphabets 
Ƶ is used in the latin version of the Karachay-Balkar alphabet to represent palatalization, with ь as the Cyrillic equivalent.

Ƶ was used in the Jaꞑalif alphabet (part of Uniform Turkic Alphabet) for the Tatar language in the first half of the 20th-century to represent a voiced postalveolar fricative , now written j.

Ƶ was used in the 1992 Latin Chechen spelling as voiced postalveolar fricative . It was also used in a 1931 variant of the Karelian alphabet for the Tver dialect.

The 1931–1941 Mongolian Latin alphabet used Ƶ to represent .

It was used in Unifon, being the Last Letter represented Voiced alveolar fricative. /z/

Use in heraldry

The Ƶ character is similar to the vertical form of the Wolfsangel (or "wolf trap") heraldic charge from medieval Germany and eastern France.

The  symbol was an early 15th-century symbol of Germanic liberty and freedom that also appears as a mason's mark and was also used as a German medieval forestry boundary marker.

Appropriation by Nazis

In World War 2, the Wolfsangel symbol was appropriated into Nazi symbolism by both military and non-military groups and now remains listed as a hate symbol by the Anti-Defamation League database. In 2020, there was a brief trend of Generation Z users of TikTok tattooing a "Generation Ƶ" symbol on their arm as "a symbol of unity in our generation but also as a sign of rebellion" (in the manner of the 15th-century Germanic peasant's revolts), however, the originator of the trend renounced it when the appropriation of the symbol by the Nazis was brought to her attention.

Use in Ukraine

Far-right movements in Ukraine like the former Social-National Assembly and the Azov Battalion have used a 90-degree rotated Ƶ symbol with an elongated center stroke for the political slogan  (Ukrainian for "National Idea", where the symbol is a composite of the "N" and the "I"); they deny any connection with Nazism, or with the Wolfsangel symbol.

Allographic variant of Z and Ż 

Many people often use Ƶ as a handwritten variant of Z and z, especially with mathematicians, scientists, and engineers to avoid confusion with the numeral 2.  

In Polish, the character Ƶ is used as an allographic variant of the letter Ż although once used in Old Polish.

In Greek, the character Ƶ is a handwritten form of the letter Xi (ξ), where the horizontal stroke distinguishes it from Zeta, ζ.

Use as a currency symbol 
Ƶ was sometimes used instead of Z to represent the zaire, a former currency of the Democratic Republic of Congo.

In video games, Ƶ has been used as a fictional currency symbol, particularly in Japanese games where it can stand for zeni (a Japanese word for money). The Dragon Ball franchise, as well as Capcom games, use Ƶ in this way. It can also be found in the games EVE Online and Ace Combat 5: The Unsung War, where it stands for, respectively, the "Interstellar Kredit" (ISK) and the "Osean Zollar".

Use in modern runic writing 

A 45-degree rotated Ƶ forms the basis of the Gibor rune, which is a pseudo-rune (i.e. not an actual ancient rune) invented in 1902 by the 19th-century Austrian mysticist and Germanic revivalist Guido von List, and features prominently in modern runic writing.

Use in computers 
The Unicode standard specifies two codepoints:

See also
Bar (diacritic)
Z (military symbol)

References

External links

Unicode Character Table: Ƶ Latin Capital Letter Z with Stroke
TikTok user has idea for a 'Gen Z tattoo,' then teens find out it looks like a Nazi symbol, USA Today (27 September 2020)

Z
Z-s